Punjab School Education Board (abbreviated P.S.E.B.) is a school board based in Mohali, Punjab, India. It was founded in 1969 under a legislative act of the Government of Punjab to administer the curriculum taught in public schools in the Punjab state and conduct standardized examinations in addition to conducting administration of scholarships, and publishing of textbooks. The headquarters of the Board are located in SAS Nagar (Mohali), near Chandigarh.

The Board is headed by a full-time Chairman whose term lasts three years and who technically reports to the Secretary of School Education in the Government of Punjab.The current Education Secretary of the board is IAS Sh Harsant Singh sekhon who is sincerely committed to shape the education system of Punjab by his pioneering Initiatives like 'Padho Punjab'.

Branches of PSEB 
Branches of PSEB
The board has following branches:
 Academic Branch
 Establishment
 Administration
 Conduct
 Secrecy
 Punjab Open School
 Construction Wing
 Account Branch
 Affiliation Branch
 Examination Branch
 Computer Center
 Legal Cell
 P.R.O
 Verification

References

External links 
 

Education in Punjab, India
State agencies of Punjab, India
State secondary education boards of India
1969 establishments in Punjab, India
Educational institutions established in 1969